The 1999 Havant Borough Council election took place on 6 May 1999 to elect members of Havant Borough Council in Hampshire, England. One third of the council was up for election and the council stayed under no overall control.

After the election, the composition of the council was
Conservative 16
Liberal Democrats 11
Labour 8
Independent 3
Liberal 1
Others 3

Election result

References

1999 English local elections
Havant Borough Council elections
1990s in Hampshire